Step on It is a 1936 American crime film directed by Harry S. Webb and starring Richard Talmadge, Lois Wilde and Roger Williams. After being kicked off the force, a former police officer single-handedly goes after a gang staging truck hold-ups.

Plot

Cast
 Richard Talmadge as Larry Evans  
 Lois Wilde as Connie Banning  
 Roger Williams as Joe Burke  
 George Walsh as  Mack  
 Eddie Davis as Frisco  
 Earl Dwire as Frank Banning  
 Robert Walker as Roger Simmons  
 Frank Hall Crane as Doctor Greene 
 Lafe McKee as Captain Bradshaw  
 Fred Parker as 'Dad', Gas Station Owner  
 Victor Metzetti as Henchman  
 Vane Calvert as Housekeeper  
 Blackie Whiteford Henchman

References

Bibliography
 Pitts, Michael R. Poverty Row Studios, 1929–1940: An Illustrated History of 55 Independent Film Companies, with a Filmography for Each. McFarland & Company, 2005.

External links
 

1936 films
1936 crime films
1930s English-language films
American crime films
Films directed by Harry S. Webb
Reliable Pictures films
American black-and-white films
1930s American films